Alessia Zecchini (born 1992) is an Italian freediver who set world and Italian records in freediving.

At the age of 13, she completed her first federal apnea course in A.s.d. "Apnea Blu Mare". In 2009 she changed clubs and became an athlete of Dive Free Roma and Nuoto Belle Arti.

Since 2012, she has been part of the indoor and outdoor Italian national freediving team, so far winning sixteen gold medals, five silver and two bronze at the World Championships and three golds, six silvers and one bronze at the European Championships.

She is currently holds the depth record with her −113 m in constant weight (monofin), achieved in August 2019 during the World Championship in Roatán, Honduras.
On 18 October 2019 she became the first woman to have reached a depth of −100 m exclusively with the use of her arms (free immersion), during the “Nirvana Oceanquest” in Curacao.

Zecchini became the subject of 2023 biographical documentary film The Deepest Breath directed by Laura McGann.

Career
From 2007 to 2010, Zecchini attended in rallies with the national team, although she could not compete in the top category due to her young age.

In 2011, she participated in her first Italian championship in Turin, taking second place, behind Ilaria Bonin. The placings achieved also in the following year earned her the call to be part of the national team. In 2012, she participated in her first CMAS European Championship in Antalya, achieving good placings (fourth place in Jump Blue and sixth in static apnea).
In 2013, during the CMAS World Championship in Kazan, she won the gold medal in static freediving (STA) with a time of 6' 23", then obtained a medal in every discipline, including a silver in dynamics without fins (DNF) and a bronze in dynamic with monofin (DYN).
At the Italian Depth Championship in Ischia, she achieved her first CMAS world record in constant weight with the monofin (CWT) with −81 m.

In 2013, Zecchini used the guide rope to pull herself down to a depth of 81 meters without using ballast or fins and thereby set a new world record in the free immersion discipline recognized by the Confédération Mondiale des Activités Subaquatiques (CMAS).

In 2014, she participated in her first AIDA International competition, the Team World Championship in Cagliari, winning three silver medals in dynamic apnea with the monofin with 223 m, in static apnea with the time of 6' 39", in constant weight with a depth of −84 m and setting two Italian records. At the CMAS European Championship held in Tenerife, she won the silver medal in dynamic apnea with monofin (DYN) with 218 m, and third place in the static apnea competition with a time of 6' 08".
During the Italian depth championship in Ischia, she achieved her second CMAS world record in constant weight with the monofin (CWT) with −86 m.

In 2015, she took part in the CMAS Indoor World Championship in Mulhouse and, together with her partner Ilaria Bonin, they won five gold and silver medals. Zecchini won the competition in dynamics without fins (DNF) with 165 m, also setting the CMAS world record. In that same competition, she also won two silvers (DYN with 234 m and STA with a time of 6'35"). During the Outdoor World Championship in Ischia, organised by the Italian Federation of Sport Fishing and Underwater Activities, she won three gold medals with relative world records: in constant weight with monofin (CWT) with −93 m, in constant weight without tools (CNF) with −58 m and in jump blue (JB) with 190 m. Once again, in June 2016 in Lignano Sabbiadoro, during the CMAS Indoor World Championships: three golds and three CMAS world records with 171 m in dynamics without fins, 204 m in dynamics with fins (DYNBP) and 250 m in dynamics with monofin (DYN).

In 2017, she began her outdoor training with international coach and safety diver Stephen Keenan, who died during a training accident with Zecchini in June of that year. Subsequently, she was under the guidance of Martin Zajac up until the conclusion of the 2018 competition season.  In the same year she beat the AIDA world record with −104 m depth in the Vertical Blue competition on May 10 on Long Island in the Bahamas. During the last days of the competition, Natalia Molchanova's record in constant weight (CWT) of −101 m (which had been held for six years), was beaten three times. On May 6, Zecchini was the first to go down and take off the tag at −102 m; breaking the world record. Four days later, Hanako Hirose dropped to −103 m but minutes later she went on to detach the tag at −104 m, setting another world record.

A month later, she participated in the CMAS European Indoor Championship in Cagliari swimming pool where she won three medals out of the three competitions (first place in DYN, second in DNF and second in DYNBP). In August of the same year, she participated in the AIDA World Championships in Roatan where she became world champion in free-immersion setting a new Italian record at −88 m and vice world champion in constant weight with monofin with −98 m. A disqualification denied her the silver medal even in constant weight without fins. In October, at the CMAS European Championship in Kaş, Turkey, she won two silver medals in CWT and CNF with −93 m and −63 m, a new Italian record. Also in the same year, during the Dungoncup in Milazzo she achieved the world record in dynamic apnea without fins with 181 m.

In 2018, Zecchini set the new AIDA world record in constant weight (CWT) on 10 May in San Andrès in Colombia in the Nirvana Oceanquest Freediving Competition. A month later, at the Indoor World Championships in Lignano Sabbiadoro, she won two silver medals in DYN and DNF and a gold medal in the bi-fin discipline where she set the new world record with 221 m. In July, in Long Island, in the prestigious Vertical Blue competition, she confirmed herself as the strongest freediver by winning the overall and setting four world records AIDA in all depth disciplines: – Constant weight without fins with −73 m, Free immersion with −93 m and then −96 m and Constant weight with monofin with −107 m. 
In September of the same year, she participated in the Dugoncup Outdoor in Milazzo setting two other world records in CWT (−101 m) and FIM (−89) but this time under the aegis of CMAS, before flying to the first edition of the Molchanova Gran Prix in memory of Natalia Molchanova, winning the competition. She participated in the CMAS Outdoor World Championship by winning three golds in the three competitions held, CWT, CNF and FIM where she set four CMAS world records, bringing the WR in constant weight with CMAS and AIDA to the same depth of −107 m.

In April 2019, during the Dungoncup in Milazzo, she again set the world record in dynamic free diving without fins with 193 m.
In June 2019, she participated, together with the Italian National team, in the CMAS Indoor European Championship in Istanbul, winning two gold medals with relative world records, 228 m in dynamics with fins and 253 m with monofin, and a silver medal in dynamics without fins. On 7 August 2019, during the CMAS Outdoor World Championship in Roatan in Honduras, at a depth of −113 meters, she set the new world record in constant weight freediving with monofin at the same time as Slovenian Alenka Artinik. During this event, she won three gold medals in CWT, CNF and FIM and set four world records during the competition and the competition that preceded it, the Caribbean Cup 2019.

During the Nirvana Oceanquest 2019 event in Curacao, she set two world records in the discipline of free immersion under the aegis of AIDA with −98 m on October 16, 2019. Two days later, with −100 m approved by CMAS, she became the first woman to touch this depth using only her arms.

In July 2021, Zecchini participated in the Vertical Blue on Long Island, Bahamas, winning the overall again and setting 3 CMAS World Records: -115 CWT, -74 CNF, -101 FIM.

In October, she took part in the CMAS Outdoor World Championship 2021, in Kaş, winning a gold medal in CNF and one silver medal in CWTB. During the "CMAS TSSF Kaş Baska Freediving WC (competition before the world championship), she set a new world record in her first competition in CWTB with the depth of -105 mt, 10 meters more than the previous record.

Honors 
Asteroid 300124 Alessiazecchini, discovered by Italian amateur astronomer Silvano Casulli in 2006, was named in her honor. The official  was published by IAU's Working Group Small Body Nomenclature on 21 March 2022.

Accomplishments 
Medals won, beginning from the first international competition in Kazan' in 2013:

World Records:

During her carrier she set 31st World Records in the indoor and outdoor disciplines of freediving, 23 homologated by CMAS CMAS and 8 by AIDA.

Clarification:
 STA = Static Apnea – Holding the breath as long as possible.
 DYN = Dynamic Apnea with fins – Diving as far as possible with the use of fins or a monofin.
 DNF = Dynamic Apnea without fins – Diving as far as possible without fins.
 CWT = Constant weight with fins – Diving as deep as possible with the use of fins or a monofin.
 CNF = Constant weight without fins – Diving as deep as possible without fins.
 FIM = Free Immersion – Diving as deep as possible by pulling down and up the rope.

References

External links 
 Official site

Italian freedivers
Living people
Divers from Rome
1992 births